This is a list of awards and nominations received by South Korean reality-variety show 2 Days & 1 Night.

KBS Entertainment Awards

Baeksang Arts Awards

Others

References 

2 Days and 1 Night